Ben Haslam (1928−2018) was an Australian rugby league footballer who played in the 1950s. He played in the NSWRFL premiership for North Sydney as a second rower.

Playing career
Haslam began his first grade career in 1952 with North Sydney a year after representing Newcastle in the country rugby league competition.  Haslam spent his earlier years playing with Central Newcastle.  Haslam was a member of the Norths sides which reached the preliminary finals in 1952 and 1953 and qualified for the finals in 1954.  Haslam also represented New South Wales City in 1952 and played an exhibition match against the American All Stars in 1953.  After leaving North Sydney, Haslam rejoined Central Newcastle and then went on to play with South Newcastle in 1957.  He died on March 27 2018 aged 89.

References

North Sydney Bears players
Rugby league second-rows
1928 births
2018 deaths
City New South Wales rugby league team players